Pitcairnia violascens is a species of plant in the family Bromeliaceae. It is endemic to Ecuador.  Its natural habitats are subtropical or tropical dry forests and subtropical or tropical dry shrubland. It is threatened by habitat loss.

References

Flora of Ecuador
violascens
Vulnerable plants
Taxonomy articles created by Polbot